Bikiya Graham-Douglas is a Nigerian-born British trained actress and performing artist. She is the daughter of Nigerian politicians Alabo Graham-Douglas and Bolere Elizabeth Ketebu. Graham-Douglas has attended and taken courses at the London Academy of Music and Dramatic Art, Oxford School of Drama, Bridge Theatre Training Company and Point Blank Music School. She has B.A. degrees in business economics and business law from the University of Portsmouth.

Graham-Douglas is the founder of the Beeta Universal Arts Foundation (BUAF).

Career
Graham-Douglas is known for her roles in movies, plays, and TV shows such as Flower Girl, Shuga, Closer, Saro, For Coloured Girls, Suru L'ere, Lunch Time Heroes, Jenifa's Diary, Legacy and The Battleground.

Her professional career started when cast in the Femi Oguns' play Torn at the Arcola Theatre London. Graham-Douglas worked with the Africa Unite Music Group which sponsored the first best African Act category at the MOBO Awards. On returning to Nigeria, she worked with MTV Base Africa on the first MTV Africa Music Awards (MAMA) and the National Theatre, Iganmu, Lagos, Nigeria.

As the founder of the Beeta Universal Arts Foundation (BUAF), Graham-Douglas supports an arts organization focused on promoting the arts through production and education. It has produced over twenty plays and has created opportunities for many artisans. BUAF has been the official theatre partner for the UNESCO "Port-Harcourt world book capital 2014–2015" and in the past was affiliated with Fela on broad way show when it toured to Nigeria. BUAF also launched the first indigenous playwright competition.

Bikiya is Executive Director of the Lagos Theatre Festival and is an advocate for the Rule of Law and Anti-Corruption (RoLAC) programme with the European Union and British Council to raise awareness on Sexual Gender-Based Violence in Nigeria. In 2019 for the 26th FESPACO, she attended as a member of the Feature film jury at Ouagadougou, Burkina Faso. She partnered with MTN on her project titled 'Beeta Playwright Competition' (BPC).

Recognition

Africa Magic Viewers Choice Awards (AMVCA 2014) – Best Supporting Actress in Drama category for her role in the movie Flower Girl.
Nollywood Movies Awards (NMA 2014)
Nigeria Entertainment Awards (NEA 2014)
National Association of Nigerian Theatre Arts Practitioners (NANTAP) Excellence Service Award

References

Further reading 
 Oyelude, Adetoun A. "What's trending in libraries from the Internet cybersphere", Library Hi Tech News, volume 31, number 4 (20140527) , .
 Omope, Don; Babatope, Seyama; Babatope, Moses; Enunwa, Diche; Okwuosa, Kene; Akaide, Dakore; Oboli, Omoni; Yekinni, Diana; Graham-Douglas, Bikiya; Tedela, Tope; Walden, Paul (director of photography); Olunuga, Re (music); LaRue, Joe (editor). Lunch time heroes. PHB Films; FilmOne Distribution; Phebean Films. DVD : NTSC color. Nigeria : A Phebean Films Production, 2015. . Sound track in English.

Actresses from Port Harcourt
Alumni of the University of Portsmouth
Businesspeople from Port Harcourt
1983 births
Living people
Nigerian stage actresses
21st-century Nigerian actresses
Nigerian women artists
Nigerian film actresses
Alumni of the Oxford School of Drama
Alumni of the London Academy of Music and Dramatic Art